XHEOE-FM is a radio station on 96.3 FM in Tapachula, Chiapas. The station is owned by Radiorama.

History
XHEOE began as XEOE-AM 810, with a concession awarded on November 16, 1961. It was owned by José Horacio Septién and transferred to Radio Amistad, S.A. in 1969.

This station and co-owned XHRPR-FM in Tuxtla Gutiérrez began broadcasting El Heraldo Radio on September 21, 2020, flipping from a romantic format known as Romántica. On April 1, 2022, Heraldo Radio dropped eight stations, including XHEOE, as affiliates.

References

Radio stations in Chiapas
Radio stations established in 1961
1961 establishments in Mexico